Clarence Stewart Williams (October 7, 1863 – October 24, 1951) was a four-star admiral in the United States Navy who served as commander in chief of the United States Asiatic Fleet from 1925 to 1927.

Early career
Born in Springfield, Ohio to Orson Williams and Pamela Floyd, he graduated from the U.S. Naval Academy in 1884 and was ordered to the sloop , flagship of the Pacific Squadron. He then served aboard the Coast Survey schooner Eagre from 1886 to 1887, aboard the sloop  patrolling the Gulf of Saint Lawrence from 1887 to 1889, and as instructor in mathematics at the U.S. Naval Academy from 1889 to 1893. From 1893 to 1896, he served as watch officer aboard the protected cruiser , which protected American interests and shipping in South America during the Brazilian Revolution and evacuated missionaries from the coast of China during the Sino-Japanese War. He returned to the Academy as an instructor of higher mathematics from 1896 to 1898.

During the Spanish–American War, he commanded the newly commissioned gunboat , which participated in the blockade of Cuba as a dispatch vessel. He was watch officer aboard the unarmored cruiser  from 1899 to 1900 and aboard the battleship  from 1900 to 1901. He participated in a preliminary hydrographic survey of Midway Island for a cable station in 1901. From 1901 to 1903, he was an instructor of navigation at the Academy, then served as executive officer of the hospital ship , as executive officer of the monitor , and as navigator of the training ship  during 1903 and 1904. He was executive officer of Iowa from 1904 to 1905, navigator of the battleship  in 1905, and executive officer of Iowa again from 1905 to 1907. He was a member of the Board of Inspection and Survey from 1911 to 1912.

He commanded the battleship  from 1912 to 1915, including operations during the Mexican Campaign of 1914. During World War I, he served as chief of staff of the Battleship Force, Atlantic Fleet; as commander of Battleship Division 8, Atlantic Fleet; and as commander of Light Cruiser Division 1, Pacific Fleet, on detached duty in the South Atlantic. He served briefly as chief of staff of the Naval War College early in 1919, but was transferred in June to command Battleship Squadron 4, Pacific Fleet.

After the war, he reported to the Navy Department to organize the Office of War Plans as its first director. He was President of the Naval War College from November 3, 1922 to September 5, 1925.

Commander in Chief, U.S. Asiatic Fleet
On October 14, 1925, Williams relieved Admiral Thomas Washington as commander in chief of the Asiatic Fleet and was promoted to the temporary rank of full admiral. As senior American officer in the Far East, Williams directed the American military intervention to protect foreign nationals in China at the beginning of the Chinese Civil War.

In 1926, the Kuomintang allied with the Chinese Communist Party to launch the Northern Expedition with the objective of unifying the country by suppressing local warlords and abrogating the unequal treaties imposed on China by the Western powers. Following the Nanking Incident, in which Kuomintang troops targeted foreign properties and personnel, Western and Japanese warships and marines were dispatched to protect and evacuate foreign nationals living in cities on the Yangtze River. As Kuomintang forces approached Shanghai, home to a large international settlement, the American minister to China, John Van Antwerpt MacMurray, requested military intervention to protect their lives and interests. The State Department directed Williams to protect lives by evacuating Americans from the interior but not to protect private property unless lives were endangered. American forces were authorized to cooperate with other foreign forces, but not to participate in joint military actions.

At the height of the crisis, 171 warships of various nations were anchored off Shanghai. The American force included four cruisers, four destroyers, an oiler, a transport, a minesweeper, and the 3rd Marine Brigade, commanded by Brigadier General Smedley D. Butler. Williams was the senior officer of the international armada, although the British had more ships. Once Shanghai was secured, Williams sent reinforcements to Tientsin with orders to defend Americans in that city; to protect the Tientsin-Peking railroad; and, if necessary, to rescue MacMurray and the American legation from Peking. The threat to foreign nationals gradually faded as the strong foreign military presence helped deter further violence targeted against foreigners, and as the uneasy alliance between the Kuomintang and the Communists disintegrated into the Chinese Civil War.

Williams was relieved as commander in chief of the Asiatic Fleet by Admiral Mark L. Bristol on September 9, 1927 and reverted to his permanent rank of rear admiral, retiring shortly thereafter.

Personal life
He married the former Anne Miller on June 6, 1888, and had a son Edgar M. Williams, who became a captain in the Navy.

He died in Charlottesville, Virginia. He is buried with his wife, son, and daughter-in-law in Arlington National Cemetery.

Gallery

References

United States Navy admirals
United States Naval Academy alumni
1863 births
1951 deaths
Presidents of the Naval War College
People from Springfield, Ohio
Burials at Arlington National Cemetery